Rodney Lynn Halbower (born June 27, 1948) is an American murderer and suspected serial killer. He is the prime suspect in the Gypsy Hill killings, a series of murders of young women in San Mateo County, California (and possibly Reno, Nevada), whose killer was named The San Mateo Slasher. In March 2014, based on DNA profiling, Halbower was named as a person of interest in the murders. By this time, Cathy Woods, a mental patient who was convicted for one of the victims' murders, was exonerated after 35 years behind bars. At the time of his identification, Halbower himself was imprisoned for 38 years in Oregon.

Early years 
Rodney Halbower was born on June 27, 1948, in Wisconsin and grew up in Muskegon, Michigan. He reportedly began to show signs of anti-social behaviour as a child and gained a reputation as a bully. He was a frequent truant and was kicked out of school and sent to an institution for juvenile offenders after an arrest.

Criminal career 

In 1963, Halbower was released on parole, but quickly violated the conditions of his probation. Released the following year, Halbower was arrested for burglarizing a house. He escaped the country prison in September. A few days later, he was captured, convicted, and sentenced to five years imprisonment. Halbower was arrested again in 1970 for theft, of which he was convicted and sentenced to 4 years imprisonment. He escaped and was recaptured again. 

In 1975, he was paroled and left Michigan and moved to Nevada, settling in Reno. In December of that year, he attacked a girl, beating and raping her. Halbower was arrested, but released on bail and remained at large during the preliminary investigation, which ended in the spring of 1976. In May, his trial began, during which he was found guilty of assaulting the girl and received a sentence of life imprisonment.

In June 1977, during a softball match in the territory near the Carson City prison, Halbower escaped. He was put on a wanted list and was recaptured in July 1977 while attempting to kidnap his 7-year-old daughter. Halbower was extradited to Nevada to serve his sentence for the rape charges. He was not tried for kidnapping his daughter, but he was convicted of fleeing from prison, for which he was later given a 6-year sentence. 

On December 15, 1977, Halbower escaped from prison, climbing on the roof of one of the buildings along the wall, reaching the fence and escaping. The investigation revealed that the escape was possible due to improper performance of duties by the guards, who were subsequently subjected to disciplinary action.

Once recaptured, in September 1978, Halbower attempted to escape from Nevada State Maximum Security Prison, but was captured before clearing a final fence. He had managed to cut through three sets of bars: one on his cell, another on the tier outside the cell, and a third set of bars on the window of the Cellhouse. He was within 100 yards of freedom when a guard saw movement outside, and notified the guard in the tower. After shots were fired, Halbower surrendered, and was escorted back into the prison.

Halbower escaped again, stole a car, and drove to Oregon, where he attacked a girl in Medford in Jackson County, raping and stabbing her several times.  The victim survived and identified Halbower, who was arrested in early 1987 and convicted in March for rape and assault. He was sentenced to 15 years imprisonment, but was extradited back to Nevada to continue serving his life imprisonment term. 

He was released from prison on parole in November 2013, but was immediately extradited to Oregon to serve his 15-year term for rape and attempted murder.

Gypsy Hill killings 

On January 8, 1976, the body of 18-year-old Veronica Cascio was discovered in a creek on the grounds of the Sharp Park Golf Course in Pacifica, California. She had suffered about 30 stab wounds. 

A few weeks later, 14-year-old Tanya Blackwell went missing after leaving her home in Pacifica. Her body was discovered on June 6 at Sharp Park Road, in a wooded area of the city known as Gypsy Hills. Like Cascio, she also had been stabbed many times.

On February 2, 17-year-old Paula Baxter went missing. Her naked body found two days later in Millbrae. She had been stabbed four times, was sexually assaulted and suffered multiple head injuries from a blunt object.

On May 6, the skeletonized remains of a woman were found in a shallow grave at San Francisco. She was later identified as 26-year-old Carol Booth, reported missing since March 15. All of the victims, with the exception of Booth, were killed in San Mateo County. The lack of witnesses and forensic evidence halted the investigations for decades.

Exposure 
In 2013, Halbower began serving his sentence in Oregon, with a set release date of 2026. During his incarceration, a blood sample was taken from him for DNA testing, which, in September 2014, showed correspondence of his genotypic profile with the profile of the man who had left biological evidence on the corpses of Paula Baxter and Veronica Cascio. The study also showed that Halbower's DNA profile coincided with the one isolated from saliva on cigarette butts found near the body of Michelle Mitchell, who was killed in February 1976 in Reno, Nevada.

In 1980, mental patient Cathy Woods had been convicted of Mitchell's murder. In 2014, DNA testing proved her innocence. In 2015, Woods was released, after spending 35 years in prison. Rodney Halbower was extradited to California, where, in January 2015, he was charged with three of the murders, to which he pled not guilty.

Halbower was suspected in the murder of Denise Lampe, but based on the results of the DNA study, 71-year-old Leon Seymour was later charged with the Lampe killing.

Trial 
Halbower was extradited to California in January 2015, but the trial was repeatedly delayed. In 2016, Halbower was declared sane and filed a petition to refuse qualified legal assistance and lawyers, and a petition to represent himself at trial. A judge denied them, as a number of experts proved that he was too incompetent to appear before the court without a proper defense team. His trial began on August 20, 2018.

At the trial, Halbower refused to plead guilty and frequently argued with the judge and prosecutors. On September 18, 2018,  Halbower was found guilty by the jury for the murders of Cascio and Baxter, and received two life sentences for each. As of 2019, he is expecting extradition to Nevada, where Halbower is due to stand trial for the murder of Michelle Mitchell.

See also 
 List of serial killers in the United States

References 

1948 births
20th-century American criminals
American escapees
American male criminals
American murderers of children
American people convicted of murder
American people convicted of robbery
American people convicted of sexual assault
American people convicted of theft
American prisoners sentenced to life imprisonment
American rapists
Criminals from Wisconsin
Criminals of the San Francisco Bay Area
Escapees from Nevada detention
Fugitives
Living people
People convicted of murder by California
Prisoners sentenced to life imprisonment by California
Prisoners sentenced to life imprisonment by Nevada
Suspected serial killers
Violence against women in the United States